Jaume Pahissa i Jo (also Jaime; October 8, 1880 – October 27, 1969, in Buenos Aires, Argentina) was a Spanish-born composer and musicologist.

From an article published in Le Figaro March 16, 1913: "We note the great success at the Liceo theater of a new lyrical work called to have a great impact. It is from the famous Catalan composer Jaume Pahissa and is titled "Gala Placidia". It is a work of great musical and scenic value." His students included Ana Serrano Redonnet.

The personal papers of Jaume Pahissa are preserved in the Biblioteca de Catalunya.

References

External links 

 Personal papers of Jaume Pahissa in the Biblioteca de Catalunya

Spanish composers
Spanish male composers
Burials at La Chacarita Cemetery
1880 births
1969 deaths
20th-century Spanish male musicians
Spanish emigrants to Argentina